Cheung Chi Tak (born 15 September 1958) is a former Hong Kong professional football player. His nickname was "Little Ghost". He is of Danish descent.

Early career
He made his professional debut in 1977 with Hong Kong Rangers FC. When his club went down to 2nd division in 1978, he moved to Caroline Hill.

Club career
In 1981, he moved to Eastern AA and then to South China AA in 1984. In 1987, he moved to Lai Sun.  His last move was to Instant-Dict FC in 1991. He retired in 1997.

International career
He scored a 30-yard freekick against China on 19 May 1985 in a 1986 FIFA World Cup qualifying game.

He competed for Hong Kong at the 1992 FIFA Futsal World Cup finals in Hong Kong.

Retirement
After retirement, he became a sports commentator on Cable TV.

References

1958 births
Living people
Hong Kong footballers
Hong Kong First Division League players
Footballers at the 1990 Asian Games
Association football fullbacks
Asian Games competitors for Hong Kong
Association football midfielders
Hong Kong international footballers